The following is a list of presidents of Culiacán Municipality in Sinaloa state, Mexico. The municipality includes the city of Culiacán.

List of officials

 Francisco Orrantia y Rocha, 1921–1922, 1925 
 Alfonso Leyzaola, 1923-1924 
 Florentino Esquerra, 1927 
 Francisco Salazar, 1928, 1935 
 Guillermo Bátiz, 1932-1934 
 Miguel Gutiérrez, 1936 
 Filiberto Mora y Ochoa, 1937-1938 
 Roberto Mejía, 1939 
 Guillermo Amezcua, 1940 
 Florentino Esquerra, 1941 
 Roberto Lizárraga, 1943-1944 
 José Z. Espinoza, 1945-1946 
 Roberto A. Hernández, 1947 
 Mariano Romero Ochoa, 1948 
 Manuel Montoya, 1949-1950 
 Manuel Rivas, 1951-1953 
 Luis Flores Sarmiento, 1954-1956 
 Emilio Aguerrebere, 1957-1959 
 Amado Estrada Rodríguez, 1960-1962 
 Benjamín J. López, 1963-1965 
 Alejandro Barrantes, 1966-1968 
 Mario Procopio Ramos Rojo, 1969-1971 
 José Mariano Carlón López, 1972-1974 
 Fortunato Alvarez Castro, 1975-1977 
 Jorge J. Chávez Castro, 1978-1980 
 Roberto Tamayo Müller, 1981-1983 
 Jorge Romero Zazueta, 1984-1986 
 Ernesto Millán Escalante, 1987-1989 
 Lauro Díaz Castro, 1990-1992 
 Humberto Gómez Campaña, 1993-1995 
 Sadol Osorio Salcido, 1996-1998 
 Gustavo Adolfo Guerrero Ramos, 1999-2001 
 Jesús Enrique Hernandez Chavez, 2002-2004 
 Aaron Irizar López, 2005-2007 
 Guadalupe de Jesús Vizcarra Calderon, 2007-2010 
 Carlos David Ibarra Félix, 2010
 Héctor Melesio Cuén Ojeda, 2010-2012
 Aaron Rivas Loaiza, 2012-2013 
 Sergio Torres Félix, 2014-2016 
 Jesús Estrada Ferreiro, 2018-2021 and 2021-2022.
 Dora María del Rosario Valdez Páez, 2022
 Juan de Dios Gámez Mendivil, 2022-present

See also
 
 Culiacán history

References

Culiacán
Politicians from Sinaloa
History of Sinaloa
People from Culiacán